Siuntio is a municipality of Finland located in the Uusimaa region in the province of Southern Finland. Its neighboring municipalities are Ingå to the west, Kirkkonummi, to the east, Lohja to the north-west, and Vihti to the north.

The municipality is bilingual. The majority of the population are Finnish-speakers with a minority of Swedish-speakers, though a majority spoke Swedish until the 1980s. Siuntio's motto is "Ota rauhallisesti - Ta det lugnt", meaning "take it easy", spelled in both Finnish and Swedish respectively. The new motto came into use following municipality's rebranding program together with the new logo in March 2021.

History

Name 
During Swedish rule over Finland the official name was "Sjundeå", which basically means "seventh river." There is strong believe that the name refers to Siuntio's river being seventh towards east from Finland's former capital Turku.

Early history 
Siuntio has been inhabited since the Stone Age, with the oldest evidence of farming settlements discovered in the river valley around the medieval Siuntio church. A Bronze-Age burial site can also be found near the church, on top of the Krejansberget hill. The oldest known document mentioning Siuntio is from the year 1382, addressing a donation for the Church of St. Lawrence in Lohja.

The Middle Ages 
During the Middle Ages Siuntio became an area of importance after two large manor houses, Suitia and Sjundby, were built there.

The earliest mention of Suitia Manor House is from 1420 in a document addressing a border conflict between Suitia estate and an estate owned by the bailiff of Häme Castle. Later, the estate came to the possession of the influential Fleming family. Over time, the Flemings acquired new land for Suitia estate; at one point, Suitia had its own harbor by the sea near the mouth of Pickala river. The Flemings also built the first ironworks in Finland, located on the Suitia Manor House's land, in 1530s.

The Sjundby Manor House is first mentioned on a document from 1417. The manor was owned by a number of nobles and royals, including Queen Christina of Sweden.

The medieval King's Road from Turku to Vyborg, used by the kings of Sweden, merchants and pilgrims, runs through Siuntio.

The stone St. Peter's Church was built around 1480 on the site of previous wooden church buildings. The sacristy, the oldest part of the church, and armory were removed after the church caught fire in 1823.

1800–2000 
The National Author of Finland, Aleksis Kivi, lived in Siuntio in Fanjunkars croft from 1864 to 1871.

The old municipality center around the church started to lose its importance after the construction of the coastal railway. The new railway station was built a few kilometers south from the church which resulted in the creation of the new municipal center around the railway station.

After the Second World War, parts of Southern Siuntio were leased to Soviet Union as part of the Porkkala Naval Base for 50 years following the 1944 Moscow Armistice between Finland, the Soviet Union and the United Kingdom. Although the land was returned to Finland in 1956, signs of Soviet occupation can still be found around the area, including military orders written in Cyrillic script on the walls of the dairy house of the Sjundby Manor House and a Soviet Triumphal Arch near Pickala Manor House.

2000–present 
In 2011 Siuntio, together with municipalities of Karjalohja, Sammatti and Nummi-Pusula, decided to merge to the city of Lohja starting in 2013. The decision was made following the encouragement from the Finnish State to merge smaller municipalities together to create larger administrative areas to eventually cut costs. However the decision caused a conflict between the Siuntio political parties also dividing the population, and after several unclear negotiation Siuntio failed to deliver any kinds of answers and therefore was cut out of the merge with Lohja.

In 2018 Siuntio joined the Helsinki Regional Transport securing good public transportation connections to Helsinki sub-region.

Politics 
Results of the 2011 Finnish parliamentary election in Siuntio:

National Coalition Party   25.0%
Swedish People's Party   21.5%
Social Democratic Party   16.6%
Finns Party   16.2%
Green League   10.2%
Centre Party   4.3%
Left Alliance   3.5%
Christian Democrats   1.7%

Nature and geography 
Siuntio is located on the south coast of Finland, west from the capital Helsinki. It is neighboured by Ingå in west, Kirkkonummi in east, Lohja in north-west and Vihti in north.

The hilly landscape of Siuntio with its valleys are characteristic for this municipality. The northern part of Siuntio has many high hills and a large esker covered in forest while the southern part of Siuntio is less hilly but also covered in forests. Smaller and larger lakes can also be found on the southern and middle parts of Siuntio. The west parts of Siuntio have large flat areas of cultivated fields.

Siuntio has also a few Natura 2000 nature protection areas such as the Plytberg Oak Forest, Torsgård's old forest, Meiko-Lappträsk lake area and the riverbanks of Siuntio river.

Lakes in Siuntio 

The 15 lakes and large ponds in Siuntio are Tjusträsk, Vikträsk, Lappträsk, Fåträsk, Svartträsk, Kakarträsk, Ormträsk, Grundträsk, Hakuträsk, Byträsk, Vikträsk, Storträsk, Lillträsk, Karhujärvi and Kvarnträsk. The largest lake is Lake Karhujärvi.

The Siuntio river 
The Siuntio river is the most dominant part of the nature in this area. Most parts of the municipality's borders follow the river and its tributaries. The Siuntio river starts from Lake Hiidenvesi in Vihti and after about 20 km ends in Baltic Sea. After the Ice Age the area of Siuntio was almost completely submerged with only highest hills visible on top of the sea. At that time the Siuntio river was a large sound bordered by the Lohja esker. Due to the post-glacial rebound more and more land was rising from the sea and the shoreline moved further and further away. The only water elements still visible nowadays from that era are the Siuntio river and a few lakes such as Lake Tjusträsk and Lake Karhujärvi.

The "Alps of Siuntio" and the "Amazon of Siuntio" 
The high hills near Siuntio church all the way to the Lake Karhujärvi are sometimes described as the Alps of Siuntio or the Switzerland of Siuntio due to the high terrain and wild untouched nature.

The last kilometre of the Siuntio River, also known as the Pickala River, is described as the Amazon of Siuntio because of its extraordinarily beautiful nature and the grand black alders growing on the riverbanks.

Villages and hamlets 
Aiskos, Andby, Backa, Bläsaby, Bocks, Bollstad, Broända (with Hovgård), Bäcks, Böle, Dansbacka, Engisby, Fall, Fjällskifte, Flyt, Fågelvik, Förby, Gammelby, Grisans, Grotbacka, Grännäs, Grönskog, Gårdskulla, Gårsböle, Gösarv, Gårdsböle, Gästans, Göks, Harvs, Hollstens, Hummerkila, Hästböle, Järvans, Kalans, Kanala, Karskog, Karuby, Kehla or Käla, Kockis, Kopula, Kvarnby, Kynnar, Lempans, Malm, Munks, Myrans, Mörsbacka, Nordanvik, Nummenkylä, Nyby, Niemenkylä, Palmgård, Pappila, Paturs, Pickala, Pulkbacka, Purnus, Påvals or Påvalsmalm, Pölans, Siggans, Sjundby, Skinnars, Skräddarskog, Störsby, Störsvik, Sunnanvik, Svartbäck, Suitia, Tyyskylä (Tjusterby), Tupala, Tupala Nyby, Veijola (Veijans or Vejans), Vesterby, Vikars, Ängsholm, Yövilä (Övitsby)

Urban area 
In 2019 there were 6 126 inhabitants in Siuntio and about half of them were living in the urban areas of Siuntio. The largest urban areas of Siuntio are the new municipal centre Siuntio Station Area (Siuntion asemanseutu) around the railway station and the old municipal centre Siuntio Church Village (Siuntion kirkonkylä) around Siuntio church. About 2 500 people were living around the Siuntio railway station and, much less, about 350 people were living around the St. Peter's Church.

Sports 
Sjundeå Idrottsförening, shortly Sjundeå IF or SIF, is a sports club established in 1918 in Siuntio. The main sports they play are handball and athletics. Both men's and women's handball teams are one of the best ones in Finland. The largest handball cup of Finland, Sjundeå Cup, is annually played in Siuntio.

Pickala Golf, located in Siuntio, is the largest golf club in Finland and the Nordic Countries with its 54 holes. The golf club has three completely different courses of 18 holes.

Religion 
Christianity is the major religion in Siuntio. Evangelical Lutheran Church of Finland is the largest religious organisation in Siuntio and it is divided into two parishes; Siuntio Finnish-speaking parish and Siuntio Swedish-speaking parish. Both parishes share the medieval stone church dedicated to St. Peter.

Before the year 2000 there was only one Evangelical-Lutheran parish in Siuntio. Due to growing Finnish-speaking population the parish was eventually divided into two based on the language.

The Finnish Orthodox Church of Helsinki has also activity in Siuntio.

Sights and cultural heritage

The Medieval Church of St. Peter 

The Church of St. Peter in Siuntio was built around 1480s during Finland's Catholic time and church still has biblical paintings on its vaults from that era. The oldest objects inside the church are also from the Middle Ages.

Suitia Manor House 
Suitia Manor House (Fin. Suitian kartano, Swe. Svidja slott) is a large stone-built Manor House built around 1540s. The walls of this grand two-storey building were made over one meter thick for defensive reasons. The first floor was rebuilt in the beginning of 1760s by Esbjörn Reuterholm. The gothic appearance we can see nowadays was added to the Manor House by August Wrede in the late 19th century and early 20th century. Suitia's large garden includes a small family cemetery of the owners of Suitia.

The state of Finland sold Suitia to a private owner with 11.7 million euros in 2015. Suitia, together with St. Peter's Church are listed as Nationally Significant Built Cultural Environment and are protected by the Finnish Heritage Agency.

Sjundby Manor House 
The Sjundby Manor House was built in 1560s by Swedish king Gustav Vasa's stall master Jakob Henriksson. The estate has been owned by many noble families and royalty, including Princess Sigrid Vasa of Sweden and Queen Christina of Sweden. The Adlercreutz family has owned Sjundby since the 18th century and tours inside the castle are arranged during summer.

Sjundby was on the Soviet side of the border during the Soviet lease of Porkkala Naval Base. During this period, the house was badly damaged but was eventually restored. Writings in Cyrillic script instructing how Soviet soldiers should behave can still be seen on the walls of Sjundby dairy house.

Sjundby is listed as Nationally Significant Built Cultural Environment and protected by the Finnish Heritage Agency.

Pickala Manor House and Soviet Triumphal Arch 
The earliest records of the Pickala Manor House date back to the 16th century; however, the main building and garden standing today dates to 1850.

Pickala Manor House was on the Soviet side of the border during the leasing of Porkkala Naval Base. Near the manor house runs a cobble stone road, known as the Kabanov's road, which runs from Pickala to a Soviet Triumphal Arch, the only surviving Soviet triumphal arch in Finland. The road was paved with cobble stone to make it strong enough for Soviet military vehicles to drive on.

Pickala Manor House and its surroundings are listed as Nationally Significant Built Cultural Environment and protected by the Finnish Heritage Agency.

Kela Railway Station 
Kela railway station was built in 1903 and its style is an excellent example of the type 5 small wooden railway station. The station is private property but protected by the Finnish Heritage Agency and listed as Nationally Significant Built Cultural Environment.

Fanjunkars 
The national author of Finland, Aleksis Kivi, lived in Fanjunkars croft in Siuntio together with Charlotta Lönnqvist from 1864 to 1871, during which Kivi wrote the novel The Seven Brothers, as well as many poems and plays. The original croft was on the Soviet side of the border during the lease of Porkkala Naval Base and was completely destroyed by Soviets; a reconstruction of Fanjunkars was built in the Siuntio municipal centre in 2002, acting as a museum and an event location.

Bronze Age burial sites 
There are many Bronze Age burial sites in Siuntio but most famous ones are located on top of the Krejansberget hill near Siuntio church and local history museum.

Siuntio Local History Museum 
The local history museum of Siuntio presents local artefacts from the Stone Age all the way to the modern Siuntio. The museum works in the former Fredriksberg's school building. Museum is open during summer.

Siuntio Spa and Lepopirtti 
Siuntio Spa was built near Lepopirtti, a wellness centre for working-class women, in 1976. Siuntio spa offers wellness services and has 3 pools, sports fields and nature paths. The spa is located by Lake Tjusträsk.

Lepopirtti wooden villa was built in 1917 and worked as a wellness centre for working-class women who were in desperate need of rest. Lepopirtti was opened by Finland's first female minister Miina Sillanpää in 1921.

Tjusterby Manor House 
Tjusterby Manor House was one of the oldest wooden manor houses in Siuntio. The house was located near the church in the Tjusterby hamlet. The Manor House was moved from Helsinki to Siuntio in the late 19th century. Tjusterby Manor was destroyed in a large fire in 2011 causing Siuntio to lose a piece of its cultural history.

A new Tjusterby manor was built on the same spot but this time built out of stone.

Gårdskulla Manor and Agricultural Museum 
Gårdskulla manor is one of the largest farms in Finland with about 680ha of land. The main building is from 1850s. Gårdskulla has a large collection of agricultural artefacts shown in its private museum. Over 100 old tractors, some cars, tools and steam machines are shown there.

Canoeing by Siuntio river and Siuntio archipelago 
Canoeing by Siuntio river and at Siuntio archipelago is a popular activity and tours with different destinations, such as Sjundby Manor, are organised in Siuntio.

Notable people 

A list of well-known people who have lived in Siuntio and/or had significant influence in the area.
 Mikael Boström, (born 1970), a Finnish orienteering competitor
 Queen Catherine of Sweden, (1550–1612), Queen consort of Sweden, she stayed short periods at Sjundby castle
 Queen Christina of Sweden, (1626–1689), the Queen of Sweden, she owned Sjundby castle.
 Karl-August Fagerholm, (1901–1984) the Speaker of Parliament and three times Prime Minister of Finland, he was born in Siuntio.
 Erik Fleming, (1487–1548), Stadholder and Council of the Realm for the King Gustav Vasa's troops in Finland, he lived at Suitia manor.
 Klaus Fleming, (1535–1597), Baron, Council of the Realm, admiral and marshal, he owned Suitia Manor.
 Axel Olof Freudenthal, (1836–1911), a Swedish-speaking Finnish philologist and politician.
 Pernilla Karlsson, (born 1990), singer, represented Finland in Eurovision Song Contest 2012
 Aleksis Kivi, (1834–1872), the National Writer of Finland, he lived in Siuntio in Fanjunkars croft.
 Charlotta Lönnqvist, (1815–1891), Finnish cultural personality, she lived in Siuntio in Fanjunkars croft.
 Gustaf Adolf Reuterholm, (1756–1813), a Swedish statesman.
 Ronya, (born 1991), a Finnish Swedish-British singer-songwriter.
 Helene Schjerfbeck, (1862–1946), painter, she spent summers at Sjundby castle
 Princess Sigrid Vasa of Sweden (1566–1633) Swedish princess, she lived at Sjundby castle
 Miina Sillanpää, (1866–1952), politician, she established Siuntio spa.
 Åke Henriksson Tott, (1598–1640), Council of the Realm and Marshall, he owned Sjundby castle
 Carl Henrik Wrangel, (1681–1755), Freiherr and Field Marshall, he influenced significantly in Siuntio.

 and from SF wiki
 Henrik Tomas Adlercreutz (SF wiki), (1732–1801), Council of the Realm. Adlercreutz owned Sjundby castle
 Ernst Johan Creutz (SF wiki), (1675-1742), Count, chancellor of the Royal Academy of Turku, he owned Sjundby castle
 August Wrede af Elimä (SF wiki), Freiherr, Wrede af Elimä, he lived at Suitia Manor
 Jaakko Henrikinpoika Hästesko (SF wiki)  (1500-1567)  Council of the Realm and colonel, part-time governor of Finland,fought the Battle of Axtorna in 1565, he lived at Sjundby castle
 Otto Mauritz Krebs (SF wiki), (1683–1768), Warlord, he lived at Sjundby castle
 Mona Leo (SF wiki) (1903–1986), poet, lived in Siuntio
 Esbjörn Reuterholm (SF wiki),  (1710–1773), Freiherr and Council of the Realm, he lived at Suitia Manor
 Hebla Sparre (SF wiki), (1490−1571), landowner and noble woman, wife to Erik Fleming, she owned Suitia Manor.
 Christoffer Strandberg (SF wiki), (born 1989) actor, he lives in Siuntio
 Juhani Stenvall (SF wiki), brother of writer Aleksis Kivi, he lived on Purnus estate in Siuntio
 Henrik Klasson Tott, (died 1603), Governor, father of Åke Henriksson Tott, he lived at Sjundby castle.

Education 
After the decision to close and sell Päivärinne primary school there are two schools in Siuntio; Aleksis Kiven Koulu and Sjundeå Svenska Skolan schools. Aleksis Kiven Koulu has a primary school and upper comprehensive school and offers education in Finnish. Sjundeå Svenska Skolan only has primary school and offers education in Swedish. In 2020 Siuntio started constructing a new school centre following the demolition of Aleksis Kiven koulu school. Aleksis Kiven koulu was demolished due to it sinking in the ground and it's inner air problems.

In the 20th century Siuntio had a fairly large amount of small village schools but the municipality has ended up focusing the schools in the municipal centre.

Siuntio doesn't have any upper secondary schools and teenagers usually start going to school in Kirkkonummi, Lohja, Vihti or Helsinki after upper comprehensive school.

The University of Helsinki had a research farm in Siuntio at Suitia manor until 2005.

Transportation 

After the Finnish state's train company, VR, threatened to cut Siuntio out of active rail services, Siuntio joined the Helsinki Regional Transport Authority (HSL) in 2018.

Coat of arms 
The coat of arms of Siuntio pictures St. Peter's (the patron saint of Siuntio St. Peter's church) key in the middle and below and on top of the key are waves that represent the Siuntio River. The colours of the coat of arms, blue, silver and gold, stem from the coat of arms of Uusimaa region.

The coat of arms of Siuntio was designed by architect A. W. Rancken and taken in use on the 22nd of April 1950.

Villages 
Aiskos, Annila (swe. Andby), Backa, Bläsaby, Bocks, Bollstad, Broända, Bäcks, Böle, Dansbacka, Engisby, Fall, Fjällskifte, Flyt, Fågelvik, Förby, Gammelby, Grisans, Grotbacka, Grännäs, Grönskog, Gårdskulla, Gårsböle, Gåsarv, Gårdsböle, Gästans, Göks, Harvs, Hollstens, Hummerkila, Hästböle, Järvans, Kalans, Kanala, Karskog, Karuby, Kela (swe. Kehla or Käla), Kockis, Kopula, Myllykylä (swe. Kvarnby), Kynnar, Lieviö (swe. Skräddarskog), Lempans, Malm, Munks, Myrans, Mörsbacka, Niemenkylä (swe. Näsby), Nordanvik, Nummenkylä, Nyby, Palmgård, Pappila (swe. Prästgård), Paturs, Pikkala (swe. Pickala), Pulkbacka, Purnus, Påvals eller Påvalsmalm, Pölans, Siggans, Sjundby, Skinnars, Störsby, Störsvik, Suitia (swe. Svidja), Sunnanvik, Svartbäck, Tupala, Tupala-Uusikylä (swe. Tupala Nyby), Tyyskylä (swe. Tjusterby), Veijola (swe. Veijans eller Vejans), Vesterby, Vikars, Yövilä (swe. Övitsby), Ängsholm.

References

External links 
 
 
Municipality of Siuntio – Official website